Callicarpa candicans is a species of flowering plant in the mint family.

Several infraspecific taxa are accepted: 
 Callicarpa candicans var. candicans (Burm.f.) Hochr.
 Callicarpa candicans f. glabriuscula (H.J.Lam) Fosberg
 Callicarpa candicans var. integrifolia (H.J.Lam) Fosberg
 Callicarpa candicans var. paucinervia (Merr.) Fosberg
 Callicarpa candicans var. ponapensis Fosberg

References

candicans
Plants described in 1934
Taxa named by Nicolaas Laurens Burman